This is a list of Swedish television related events from 2000.

Events
13 May - The 45th Eurovision Song Contest is held at the Globe Arena in Stockholm. Denmark wins the contest with the song "Fly on the Wings of Love", performed by Olsen Brothers.
4 September - The television reality show Big Brother Sverige debuts on Kanal5.
15 December - The first season of Big Brother Sverige is won by Angelica Freij.
Unknown - Niklas Frisk and Lilian Bokestig win the sixth season of Sikta mot stjärnorna performing as Meat Loaf and Cher.

Debuts

Domestic
4 September - Big Brother Sverige (2000-2004, 2011-2012)

International
4 March -  Pokémon (1997–present) (TV4)
6 October -  The Sopranos (1999-2007)
 Law & Order: Special Victims Unit (1999–present)

Television shows
1-24 December - Ronny & Julia

1990s
Sikta mot stjärnorna (1994-2002)

Ending this year

Births

Deaths

See also

2000 in Sweden

References